W. Park Rankin was the General Secretary of the Bible Society of India, Bangalore and held office during 1959-1960.

Ecclesiastical ministry

Mumbai (India)
Earlier, Rankin was the Auxiliary Secretary of the Bombay Auxiliary during 1953-1959 and was involved in the translation of the Bible into Marathi language and Gujarati language.  When Rankin's services were required at the Central Office of the Bible Society of India, Rankin left from Mumbai to Bangalore in 1959 making J. B. Satyavrata to hold the post of Auxiliary Secretary of the Bible Society of India Bombay Auxiliary.  Although Rankin was supposed to return to Mumbai after a year, his return got delayed due to which Satyavrata was appointed as full-time Auxiliary Secretary of the Bombay Auxiliary.

Bangalore (India)
Rankin was General Secretary of the Bible Society of India for a year during 1959-1960 till a successor was selected and appointed.  When the Bible Society of India Trust Association chose the rural Pastor, A. E. Inbanathan as the next General Secretary, Rankin continued to be in Bangalore and served as Deputy General Secretary of the Bible Society of India to help the new General Secretary get acquainted with the knowledge required to take forward the work of the Bible Society of India.  It was during Rankin's incumbency that the foundation for the Translations Department was laid resulting in the appointment of Chrysostom Arangaden as Associate General Secretary (Translations).

During Rankin's period of stay in Bangalore, he became full-time Presbyter of the St. Andrew's Church of the Church of South India where he served during 1960-1961.  Chrysostom Arangaden, the newly appointed Associate General Secretary (Translations), Bible Society of India also served as Associate Presbyter at the St. Andrew's Church during 1960 along with his colleague Rankin.

Addis Ababa (Ethiopia)
Rankin later left for Ethiopia where he was the Bible Society in Ethiopia and later served the visually challenged at a home in Addis Ababa.

References
Notes

Academic staff of the Senate of Serampore College (University)
Indian Christian theologians
Writers from Bangalore
20th-century Indian philosophers